The Riverport riot took place on July 2, 1991, at the Riverport Amphitheatre (now named Hollywood Casino Amphitheatre) in Maryland Heights, Missouri (near St. Louis) during a concert by American rock band Guns N' Roses on their Use Your Illusion Tour. It is also known as the "Rocket Queen Riot".

Incident

During the band's performance of "Rocket Queen", the fifteenth song in the set (counting drum and guitar solos), singer Axl Rose, in the middle of the chorus, pointed out a fan who was taking still pictures of the show, saying, "Hey, take that! Take that! Now, get that guy and take that!" With security unable to confront the person, Rose decided to confiscate the camera himself, saying "I'll take it, goddamn it!" and then jumped into the audience and tackled the person. After taking the camera, striking members of the audience and the security team, and being pulled out of the audience by crew members, Rose grabbed his microphone and said "Well, thanks to the lame-ass security, I'm going home!", slammed his microphone on the stage and left.

After Rose left, guitarist Slash quickly told the audience, "He just smashed the microphone. We're out of here." This infuriated the audience, setting off a three-hour riot in which dozens were injured. The footage was captured by Robert John, who was documenting the tour for the band. Rose was charged with having incited the riot, but police were unable to arrest him until almost a year later, as the band had gone overseas to continue the tour. Charges were filed against Rose but a judge ruled that he did not directly incite the riot.

"When something like that happens, you can't help but think back to Donington," noted guitarist Izzy Stradlin, referring to the 1988 festival at which two fans died during Guns' set. "What's to stop us having some more people trampled, because the singer doesn't like something?"

Rose later stated that the Guns N' Roses security team had made four separate requests to the venue's security staff to remove the camera, each of which were ignored; that members of the band had reported being hit by bottles from the audience; and that the venue's security had allowed weapons into the arena and refused to enforce a drinking limit. Consequently, Use Your Illusion I and IIs artwork featured a message in their 'Thank You' notes: "Fuck You, St. Louis!"

The band did not play in the city again until July 27, 2017, on the Not in This Lifetime... Tour as they had been banned from playing in St. Louis because of the incident.

References

1991 in American music
1991 in Missouri
1991 crimes in the United States
1991 riots
Guns N' Roses
History of St. Louis County, Missouri
July 1991 events in the United States
Music of Missouri
Music riots
Riots and civil disorder in Missouri